Stefan Kozlov was the defending champion but lost in the second round to Dominic Stricker.

Yoshihito Nishioka won the title after defeating Stricker 6–2, 6–4 in the final.

Seeds

Draw

Finals

Top half

Bottom half

References

External links
Main draw
Qualifying draw

Columbus Challenger - 1